Slik is the only studio album of 1970s Scottish teenybop band Slik.

Following the Bay City Rollers style, plus the ballads and pop of the time, Slik released two hit singles before the album, "Forever And Ever" in 1975, and "Requiem" in 1976, which oriented the band to the success and recognition in their native Scotland. At the end of 1976, punk rock emerged, and bands of the latter genre became popular, decreasing the popularity of established progressive or glam groups bands like Slik. Possibly for these reasons, the album was not well received.

The band continued until early 1977, when Jim McGinlay left the band, being replaced  by Russell Webb (later in The Skids and Public Image Ltd.), and the new line-up left the 1970s disco, soft and pop rock-oriented genre, moving to punk and changing the name to PVC2. The band released one single, "Put You in the Picture". Shortly afterwards, they disbanded, and Kenny Hyslop, Billy McIsaac and Russell Webb formed The Zones. Midge Ure moved to London and worked with Rich Kids, along ex-Sex Pistols Glen Matlock and future Visage bandmate Rusty Egan.

In 2007, 7T’s Records re-released the album on CD, adding bonus tracks.

Track listing

Charts

Personnel
 Midge Ure - lead vocals, guitar
 Jim McGinlay - bass guitar
 Billy McIsaac - keyboards
 Kenny Hyslop - drums

References

External links
 Description of the album, and comments and track listing of the reissued version on CD
 Description of the album

1976 debut albums
Slik albums
Albums produced by Phil Coulter
Albums produced by Bill Martin (musician)
Bell Records albums